Théodore Barrière (1823 – 16 October 1877), French playwright, was born in Paris.

He belonged to a family of map engravers which had long been connected with the war department, and spent nine years in that service himself. The success of a vaudeville he had performed at the Beaumarchais and which was immediately snapped up for the repertory of the Palais Royal, showed him his real vocation. During the next thirty years he signed, alone or in collaboration, over a hundred plays; among the most successful were: 
La Vie de bohème (1849), adapted from Henri Murger’s book with the novelist's help
Manon Lescaut (1851)
Les Filles de marbre (1853) (subsequently adapted into English as The Marble Heart by Charles Selby)
Les Faux Bonshommes (1856) with Ernest Capendu
L’Héritage de Monsieur Plumet (1858)
Les Gens nerveux (1860), with Victorien Sardou
Malheureux vaincus (1865), which was forbidden by the censor
Le Gascon (1878).

Barrière died in Paris.

Notes

References

External links

 
 
 

1823 births
1877 deaths
19th-century French dramatists and playwrights
Burials at Père Lachaise Cemetery
Writers from Paris